TSX is the Toronto Stock Exchange in Canada.

TSX may also refer to:

Vehicles
 Acura TSX, an automobile
 Suzuki TSX, a motorcycle
 Triumph T140 TSX, a motorcycle

Other uses
 TSX Group, the TMX Group, which owns and operates stock exchanges including the Toronto Stock Exchange
 Transactional Synchronization Extensions, an extension to the x86 instruction set architecture
 Mubami language (ISO 639 code)

See also
 TSX-5 (Tri-Service-Experiments mission 5), a satellite
 TSX Venture Exchange (TSX-V)
 TSX-32, an operating system